José Luis García del Pozo (born 11 January 1991), known as Recio, is a Spanish professional footballer who plays as a central midfielder for Cypriot club Apollon Limassol FC.

Club career

Málaga
Born in Málaga, Andalusia, Recio was a product of local Málaga CF's youth system. He made his first-team debut on 11 November 2010 shortly after the arrival of manager Manuel Pellegrini who succeeded sacked Jesualdo Ferreira, starting in a Copa del Rey 3–2 home win against Hércules CF, in the round-of-32's second leg (3–2 on aggregate). Ten days later he first appeared in La Liga, again as a starter but in a 3–0 loss at Deportivo de La Coruña.

Late into the month, after performing solidly in his first matches, Recio signed his first professional contract, linking him with Málaga until the summer of 2015. On 5 December 2010 he scored his first goal as a senior, in a 4–1 home victory over Racing de Santander.

On 9 January 2013, after featuring rarely during the first half of the season, Recio was loaned to neighbouring and fellow league club Granada CF, until June. He made his debut five days later, coming on as a substitute in a 2−2 away draw against Getafe CF. He netted his first goal for the side on the 19th, in a 2−0 home defeat of Rayo Vallecano that also was his first start.

Upon returning Recio became an undisputed starter, signing a contract extension until 2018 on 11 December 2014. On 21 February 2017, he renewed his link until 2021.

Leganés
On 31 August 2018, after Málaga's relegation from the top flight, Recio signed a four-year deal with CD Leganés. On 4 September 2020, as Lega met the same fate as his previous club, he was loaned to SD Eibar for one year.

International career
On 24 March 2011, courtesy of his performances with Málaga's first team, Recio made his debut with Spain under-21s, in a friendly against France. Also that year, he represented his country in the FIFA U-20 World Cup held in Colombia, appearing in four games in an eventual quarter-final exit.

Career statistics

References

External links
Málaga official profile

1991 births
Living people
Spanish footballers
Footballers from Málaga
Association football midfielders
La Liga players
Segunda División players
Tercera División players
Atlético Malagueño players
Málaga CF players
Granada CF footballers
CD Leganés players
SD Eibar footballers
Cypriot First Division players
Apollon Limassol FC players
Spain youth international footballers
Spain under-21 international footballers
Spanish expatriate footballers
Expatriate footballers in Cyprus
Spanish expatriate sportspeople in Cyprus